Soso Baike (Soso Encyclopedia) is a Chinese-language collaborative web-based encyclopedia provided by the Chinese search engine Soso. Soso is part of Tencent, China's largest internal portal.

Chinese online encyclopedias
Tencent